Daria Ibragimova (born 16 June 1984) is a Russian mixed martial artist, currently competing for Invicta Fighting Championships.

Mixed martial arts record

|-
|Loss
|align=center|9–2
|Cris Cyborg
|KO (punches)
|Invicta FC 15: Cyborg vs. Ibragimova
|
|align=center|1
|align=center|4:58
| Costa Mesa, California, United States
|
|-
| Win
| align=center| 9–1
| Anastasia Plisenkova
| Submission (rear naked choke)
| Fight Nights - Fight Club 4
| 
| align=center| 1
| align=center| 0:28
| Moscow, Russia
|
|-
| Win
| align=center| 8–1
| Anastasia Kravets
| Submission (rear naked choke)
| RFP - Ibragimova vs. Kravets
| 
| align=center| 1
| align=center| 1:48
| Dubno, Ukraine
|
|-
| Win
| align=center| 7–1
| Mariam Khalilova
| Submission (armbar)
| Fight Nights - Fight Club 1
| 
| align=center| 1
| align=center| 1:01
| Moscow, Russia
|
|-
| Win
| align=center| 6–1
| Yulia Drukteynite
| TKO (punches)
| WFC - Wolf Fighting Club 5
| 
| align=center| 1
| align=center| 1:06
| Lviv, Ukraine
|
|-
| Win
| align=center| 5–1
| Ekaterina Tarnavskaja
| Submission (armbar)
| OC - Oplot Challenge 89
| 
| align=center| 1
| align=center| 0:36
| Kharkov, Ukraine
|
|-
| Win
| align=center| 4–1
| Ludmila Radko
| Submission (armbar)
| OC - Oplot Challenge 87
| 
| align=center| 2
| align=center| 2:20
| Kharkov, Ukraine
|
|-
| Win
| align=center| 3–1
| Ludmila Radko
| Submission (rear naked choke)
| M-1 Selection 2010 - Eastern Europe Round 3
| 
| align=center| 1
| align=center| 0:34
| Kyiv, Ukraine
|
|-
| Loss
| align=center| 2–1
| Cindy Dandois
| Submission (triangle choke)
| M-1 Selection 2010 - Western Europe Round 2
| 
| align=center| 1
| align=center| 3:02
| Weesp, Netherlands
|
|-
| Win
| align=center| 2–0
| Tatiana Montyan
| Decision (Unanimous)
| M-1 Ukraine - 2009 Selections 4
| 
| align=center| 2
| align=center| 5:00
| Kyiv, Ukraine
|
|-
| Win
| align=center| 1–0
| Vladena Yavorskaya
| Submission (armbar)
| M-1 Challenge 20 - 2009 Finals
| 
| align=center| 2
| align=center| 1:54
| St. Petersburg, Russia
|

References

External links
 

1984 births
Living people
Featherweight mixed martial artists
Russian sambo practitioners
Russian female mixed martial artists
Bantamweight mixed martial artists
Russian sumo wrestlers
Mixed martial artists utilizing sambo